Puxian opera, also known as Xinghua opera or Hinghwa opera, is a variety of Chinese opera from Putian, Fujian province, China. It enjoys a good popularity in Putian, but is endangered just like Puxian Min and other Chinese operas.

References

Chinese opera
Hokkien opera styles